Carl Winston Lumbly (born August 14, 1951) is an American actor. He is known for his roles as Dick Hallorann in Doctor Sleep, NYPD detective Marcus Petrie on the CBS police drama Cagney & Lacey, CIA agent Marcus Dixon on the ABC espionage drama series Alias, and as the voice of J'onn J'onnz / Martian Manhunter in the animated series Justice League and Justice League Unlimited, as well as the direct-to-video animated film Justice League: Doom and the video game Injustice: Gods Among Us. Lumbly is also known for his roles on The CW's Arrowverse as J'onn J'onnz's father, M'yrnn, on Supergirl from 2017 until 2019, and in the Marvel Cinematic Universe (MCU) installments The Falcon and the Winter Soldier (2021) and Captain America: New World Order (2024) as Isaiah Bradley, the first black super-soldier.

Early life
Lumbly was born to Jamaican immigrants in Minneapolis, Minnesota. He graduated from South High School there and Macalester College in nearby St. Paul.

Lumbly's first career was as a journalist in Minnesota. While on assignment for a story about a workshop theatre, he was cast as an actor. He stayed with the improvisational company for two years and later moved to San Francisco where he discovered a newspaper ad seeking “two black actors for South African political plays.” He went to the audition and landed one of the parts (along with then-unknown Danny Glover). Lumbly toured with Glover in productions of Athol Fugard's Sizwe Bansi is Dead and The Island.

Career
His first major role was Detective Marcus Petrie on the television series Cagney & Lacey (1982–1988), where his character was paired with Detective Victor Isbecki (Martin Kove). In 1985, he appeared as Theseus in The Gospel At Colonus, an African-American musical iteration of the Oedipus legend on PBS' Great Performances series.

In 1987, he garnered positive reviews for his portrayal of Black Panther Party co-founder Bobby Seale in the HBO television film Conspiracy: The Trial of the Chicago 8. From 1989 to 1990, he portrayed ongoing character Earl Williams (named for the prisoner in Ben Hecht and Charles MacArthur's story The Front Page), a teacher falsely accused of the rape/murder of a female student, in the series L.A. Law.

In 1990, he co-starred in Charles Burnett's critically acclaimed film To Sleep with Anger. From 1994 to 1995, Lumbly starred as the main character in the short-lived science fiction series M.A.N.T.I.S.. One of his most visible roles was as Marcus Dixon in the American television series Alias (2001–2006).

Other prominent roles include providing the voice for Martian Manhunter in Justice League and Justice League Unlimited, as well as the character's father, M'yrnn J'onzz, in the series Supergirl. In Superman: The Animated Series, Lumbly voiced the mayor of Metropolis in the episode "Speed Demons" in 1997, and an alien military general in the episode "Absolute Power" in 1999. He voiced the villain Stalker on Batman Beyond.

In 2000, Lumbly portrayed activist and Congressman Ron Dellums in the Disney Channel original film The Color of Friendship. Although the film was focused on Dellums' daughter's friendship with a white South African girl, the film also discussed Dellums' role in ending apartheid in South Africa.

Also in 2000, Lumbly guest starred in the season one The West Wing episode "Six Meetings Before Lunch" as Jeff Breckenridge, a nominee for U.S. Assistant Attorney General who supports reparations for slavery. Lumbly appeared as Daniel "Bulldog" Novacek in the 2004 television series Battlestar Galactica. He also plays a role in the Kane's Wrath expansion pack for the video game Command and Conquer 3. More recently, he played police captain Joe Rucker on TNT's Southland.

In 2021, Lumbly guest starred in several episodes of the Disney+ series The Falcon and the Winter Soldier (2021) as Isaiah Bradley, set in the Marvel Cinematic Universe (MCU), and will reprise his role in the feature film Captain America: New World Order (2024).

He was also cast as the father of Beth Pearson, Abraham Clarke, in the series, This is Us.

Personal life
Lumbly has been married twice and has one son. He was married to actress Vonetta McGee from 1987 until her death in 2010. Together they had one son, born in 1988. Lumbly married author Deborah Santana in 2015 and the couple divorced in 2019.

Filmography

Film

Television

Theatre

Video games

Awards and nominations
 1980: Los Angeles Drama Critics Circle Award, Lead Performance – Eden

References

External links
 

1951 births
American actors of Jamaican descent
American male film actors
American male stage actors
American male television actors
American male voice actors
Male actors from Minneapolis
Macalester College alumni
Living people
American male video game actors
South High School (Minnesota) alumni
20th-century American male actors
21st-century American male actors